"Astronaut" is the third single from Simple Plan's fourth studio album, Get Your Heart On!. In December 2012, the song was played in Earth orbit by astronaut Chris Hadfield.

Music video
The music video was directed by Mark Staubach and premiered on 19 September 2011. It was filmed in the desert of California. The clip opens with a message that read, "Being human is the most terrible loneliness in the universe" and continues to show a lone man exploring an empty space. He keeps looking around and around for something, or rather someone, to fill a void in his heart. The female lead for the clip is Caitlin O'Connor, a model/actress, who has previously played in music videos for Michael Bublé and New Found Glory.

The song was nominated in the category Best International Video by a Canadian band to 2012 MuchMusic Video Awards.

In the video, the man, played by Nick Gamez, is seen with a name tag that says P. Cunningham. The same name was used for the drunk driver in the music video for "Untitled".

Track listing
"Astronaut" – 3:41

Charts

References

2011 singles
Rock ballads
Simple Plan songs
Songs written by Pierre Bouvier
Songs written by Chuck Comeau
Songs written by Jim Irvin
Songs written by Julian Emery
Lava Records singles
Songs about loneliness
2011 songs